The 2002 Shreveport mayoral election resulted in the re-election of Democrat Keith Hightower who defeated Republican Vernon Adams by a large margin in the election of October 5, 2002. As Hightower won a simple majority in this round, no run-off election was held.

Results

|}

References

Shreveport
Government of Shreveport, Louisiana
2002 Louisiana elections
October 2002 events in the United States